The 1979 Thomas Cup was the 11th edition of the Thomas Cup competition, the world championship of men's international team badminton. The final rounds contested by qualifying zone winners and defending champions Indonesia were held at the Istora Senayan in Jakarta, Indonesia in late May and early June. First played in 1948–49, the Thomas Cup competition was held every three years until 1982, and since then has been held every two years.

Indonesia won its seventh title after beating Denmark in the final round.

Teams
21 teams from 4 regions took part in the competition. As defending champion, Indonesia skipped the Qualifications and the first round, and played directly in the second round (semifinal) of the Inter-Zone Ties.

Australasian zone

Asian zone

European zone

Panamerican zone

Qualification (intra-zone) summary

Political disputes played a significant role in the 1978–1979 Thomas Cup series. Though The People's Republic of China had been producing players of astonishing ability since the mid-1960s, its entry into the International Badminton Federation (now the Badminton World Federation) had been delayed for years over the Taiwan issue. In 1978 the PRC took the step of fostering a rival international badminton organization and running its own version of a world championship (for individual players) in 1979.

Australasian zone
Competing in the Australasian zone for the first time since the 1966-1967 series, Japan encountered strong opposition from host New Zealand but survived 5–4. It was Richard Purser's sixth Thomas Cup campaign for the Kiwis. The Japanese then went on to shut out Australia in the zone final, despite some close matches.

Asian zone
The Asian zone all but disappeared in the political upheaval, as four national teams, including traditionally strong Thailand, either withdrew or were scratched from the competition. This left only India to visit Malaysia in a replay of their 1976 tie (team match), which Malaysia had won after trailing 1–4. Those young Malaysians had gone on to reach the tournament final  but none had since developed into true world-class stars. Thus India, on the strength of three wins by Prakash Padukone, was able to avenge its 1976 loss in another extremely close contest (5–4) and win the Asian zone for the first time since 1955.

European zone
In the European Zone, England could not take advantage of a fine performance by Ray Stevens (winning only matches where he participated), and went down to Sweden 3–6. The Swedes, however, were beaten in the final for the fourth consecutive time by Denmark 2–7. It was the last of five occasions in which Denmark's Svend Pri and Sweden's Sture Johnsson played on opposite sides of a Thomas Cup tie, though they did not play directly against each other this time. Young Morten Frost for Denmark and Thomas Kihlstrom for Sweden were the leading performers in the contest.

Panamerican zone
The fallout over these developments reached into the Pan American zone of Thomas Cup which Taiwan (Republic of China) had entered. Drawing Mexico, Taiwan agreed to drop out of the competition when the Mexican Association protested against its entry. Mexico then defaulted the zone final to Canada which, effectively, won the zone by squeezing past the USA in the semifinal 5–4. In nine Thomas Cup meetings between Canada and the United States it was the first time in which no player over 30 participated in the tie.

Inter-zone playoffs

The inter-zone ties (team matches) were hosted by defending champion Indonesia at Jakarta in late May and early June. Contesting in an out-bracket tie for the right to play Indonesia in the semifinals, Japan decisively defeated Canada 8–1, U.S. born Pat Tryon scoring the lone point for the Canadians. The first semifinal tie pitted Denmark against India in what might have been expected to have been a very close encounter. Typically talented, Danish squads had also, typically, struggled in the tropical heat and humidity. This time, however, Denmark came through in the uncongenial climate 7–2; the pivotal match probably being wily veteran Svend Pri's inspiring victory over the much younger Prakash Padukone (less than a year before Padukone's triumph at the All-England Championships).

The second semifinal presented Japan with the daunting task of facing a powerhouse Indonesian squad in an Indonesian setting. Moreover, these Japanese players, especially in singles, were not as internationally accomplished as the highly competitive Japanese stars of a decade earlier. It came as quite a surprise, then, when Japan's number one singles player, Kinji Zeniya, began the series by racing off to a 14–9 lead on reigning All-England champion Liem Swie King. This, however, was as close to a victory as Japan came. King recovered to win the game 17–16 and nearly blanked Zeniya in the second game. Fighting hard throughout, the Japanese were successively worn down by better players who were also more accustomed to the tropical conditions. It was the first time that Japan had been on the losing side of a Thomas Cup shut-out. Thus for the fourth time, the third in a championship tie, Indonesia and Denmark squared-off in Thomas Cup competition.

First round

Semi-finals

Final
Though Svend Pri was 34 and by this time only the third ranked singles player in Denmark, his record of winning clutch singles matches in tropical conditions had earned him a slot in the top two singles positions. Indonesia might have placed the iconic Rudy Hartono (two months shy of 30) in a similar position in its lineup and thus effected a sequel to their long rivalry. It was not to be, as Indonesia placed Hartono in the third singles position. Nevertheless, in "veteran" Iie Sumirat, only a year younger than Hartono and, like Pri, something of a showman, Pri drew a worthy adversary. Their opening contest, the most interesting of the tie, was won by Sumirat 15–10 in the third game. Except for a three-game win by Sumirat over rising star Morten Frost on the second night, every other match was routinely taken by Indonesia. Flemming Delfs, whose play in the tropics was almost invariably a full level below its European standard, lost tamely to Hartono, and only one doubles game in eight was close. Thus for the second straight time Indonesia shut-out its final opponent in Thomas Cup, thereby winning the Cup for the seventh time in eight attempts.

Though probably not anticipated at the time, this was the final Thomas Cup appearance of the great Indonesian doubles team of Tjun Tjun and Johan Wahjudi, Tjun Tjun being unbeaten in three campaigns which included an appearance in singles. His equally illustrious contemporary, Christian Hadinata, would play in three more series (through 1986) and lose only one match in his Thomas cup career. Hartono would play in one more series (1981-1982), the first in which Indonesia's great rival China would finally compete. As for Svend Pri, this was his final Thomas Cup tie and the only one in which he failed to win at least one match.

References

External links
tangkis.tripod.com

Thomas Cup
Thomas Cup
Thomas & Uber Cup